Shang Yi (born 20 January 1979) is Chinese former footballer who played at both professional and international levels, as a midfielder. He is a commentator for Beijing TV Sports Channel.

Career
Born in Tianjin, Shang began his career at Beijing Guoan, spending his entire career there, minus a short spell in Spain with Xerez during the 2003–04 season. While at Xerez, Shang hit the headlines after the club was paid to play him by a "personal sponsor" of the player. He is mainly remembered for scoring a goal versus Cádiz CF, fierce rivals of the club

Shang earned two caps for China in 2000.

Shang became a commentator for Beijing TV Sports Channel after his retirement.

Personal life
Shang Yi married table tennis player Wu Na in 2003. They have a son Shang Juncheng who is a professional tennis player.

Honours
Beijing Guoan
Chinese FA Cup: 2003

References

1979 births
Living people
Chinese footballers
Footballers from Tianjin
China international footballers
Chinese association football commentators
Chinese Super League players
Beijing Guoan F.C. players
Xerez CD footballers
Chinese expatriate footballers
Expatriate footballers in Spain
Chinese expatriate sportspeople in Spain
Association football midfielders